Aladdin Mumohamed Elghobashy (January 8, 1957 – June 21, 2011) was an Egyptian imam.

Positions held
Grand Imam of al-Azhar and the Islamic Cultural Center in Rome from 2006 to 2011, he was later appointed in search of an Islamic public administration Islamic Research in Cairo and Imam of the Islamic Center of Las Vegas.
Artistic Director of the Office of the Secretary General of the Islamic Research Academy in Cairo, he worked at the Islamic University of Imam Muhammad bin Saud.

1957 births
2011 deaths
Egyptian imams
People from Gharbia Governorate
Egyptian expatriates in Italy